Shakhruddin Magomedovich Magomedaliyev (born 12 June 1994) is a professional footballer who plays as a goalkeeper for Azerbaijan Premier League club Qarabağ. Born in Russia, he plays for the Azerbaijan national team.

Club career
On 8 February 2014, Magomedaliyev made his debut for Sumgayit in a 2–2 draw against Shuvalan in the Azerbaijan Premier League.

Magomedaliyev signed a contract with Qarabağ on 16 January 2016. He made his debut for the club on 6 February 2016 in an Azerbaijan Premier League match against Khazar Lankaran, which Qarabağ won 3–0. On 20 May 2019, he signed a new three-year contract with Qarabağ.

On 12 December 2019, Magomedaliyev made his European debut in a 1–1 draw against Luxembourgish club F91 Dudelange in the UEFA Europa League group stage.

International career 
Magomedaliyev was included in the squad of hosts Azerbaijan's under-23 team at the 2017 Islamic Solidarity Games in Baku, in which Azerbaijan went on to win the gold medal.

Honours
 Qarabağ
 Azerbaijan Premier League: 2015–16, 2016–17, 2017–18, 2018–19, 2019–20, 2021–22
 Azerbaijan Cup: 2015–16, 2016–17, 2021–22
Azerbaijan U23
 Islamic Solidarity Games: 2017

References

External links
 
 

1994 births
Living people
Sportspeople from Makhachkala
Association football goalkeepers
Citizens of Azerbaijan through descent
Azerbaijani footballers
Azerbaijan international footballers
Azerbaijan under-21 international footballers
Russian footballers
Russian sportspeople of Azerbaijani descent
FC Torpedo Moscow players
FC Strogino Moscow players
FC Anzhi Makhachkala players
Shahdag Qusar FK players
Sumgayit FK players
Qarabağ FK players
Azerbaijan Premier League players